Emile Eid (born March 15, 1925 in Mazraat el Daher, Lebanon - died November 30, 2009) was the Maronite Catholic titular bishop of Sarepta dei Maroniti.

Life

Ordained to the priesthood on May 6, 1951, to the Maronite Catholic Eparchy of Sidon, Eid was named titular bishop on December 20, 1982 and was ordained bishop of Sarepta dei Maroniti on January 23, 1983 by Maronite Patriarch of Antioch, Anthony Peter Khoraish, and his co-consecrators were Nasrallah Boutros Sfeir, Titular bishop of Tarsus dei Maroniti and Ibrahim Hélou, Eparch of Sidon. Bishop Eid served as vice president of the commission that wrote the Code of Canons of the Eastern Churches. On October 18, 1990 Eid resigned his duties as bishop due to age-related reasons.

Emile Eid died on November 30, 2009.

Notes

External links
 Emile Eid

20th-century Maronite Catholic bishops
1925 births
2009 deaths
Lebanese clergy